Ozona High School is a public high school located in Ozona, Texas (USA) and classified as a 2A school by the UIL. It is part of the Crockett County Consolidated Common School District which covers all of Crockett County. Although the district is county-wide, the high school goes by Ozona. Ozona High School is known for the Lion Band. Although there is a lack of an FFA, CDE and LDE program, there is a stock show and 4-H program that is strong in the community. In 2015, the school was rated "Met Standard" by the Texas Education Agency.

Athletics
The Ozona Lions compete in these sports - 

Baseball
Basketball
Cross Country
Football
Golf
Powerlifting
Softball
Tennis
Track and Field

State Titles
Girls Basketball - 
1995(2A), 1996(2A)
Boys Cross Country - 
2004(2A), 2013(1A)
Girls Golf - 
1997(2A)

References

External links
 Crockett County Consolidated CSD

Schools in Crockett County, Texas
Public high schools in Texas
Recorded Texas Historic Landmarks